Rhynchospora cephalantha, known by the common name of bunched beaksedge, is a member of the sedge family, Cyperaceae. It is a perennial herb, found throughout the eastern United States, from New York to Texas.

References

External links

cephalantha
Flora of the Eastern United States
Flora of the Southeastern United States
Flora of Texas
Plants described in 1835